Bryan Jeffrey Schurgard Townsend (born May 19, 1981) is an American politician who represents District 11 in the Delaware Senate. Townsend was elected Senate Majority Leader in 2020. He graduated from the University of Delaware in 2003.

As a political newcomer, Townsend defeated Anthony J. DeLuca—who was then President pro tempore of the Delaware Senate—in the 2012 Democratic primary by 57 percent to 42 percent.  Townsend went on to defeat Republican Evan Queitsch in the general election, winning 78 percent of the vote.

Townsend was reelected in 2014. He defeated primary challenger David L. Tackett with 78 percent of the vote, and was unopposed in the general election.

In September 2015, in the wake of Representative John Carney's announcement that he would run for Governor of the state, Townsend announced his candidacy for Delaware's at-large seat in the U.S. House of Representatives.  On September 13, 2016, his candidacy ended when he placed second in a six-way Democratic primary, behind Lisa Blunt Rochester (25% to 44%).

References

External links
Official page at the Delaware General Assembly
Bryan Townsend State Senate Site
Bryan Townsend Congressional Campaign Site

1981 births
21st-century American politicians
Alumni of the University of Cambridge
Democratic Party Delaware state senators
Living people
People from Wilmington, Delaware
University of Delaware alumni
Yale Law School alumni